Edmond Kapllani (born 31 July 1982) is a former Albanian footballer.

Club career
Born in Durrës, Albania, Kapllani began his career with KS Teuta Durrës, KF Partizani Tirana and KS Besa Kavajë in the Albanian Superliga. He also spent one year in Croatia with NK Orijent, but after an uneventful season he soon returned to play in Albania.

Karlsruher SC
On 1 July 2004, Kapllani joined the then 2. Bundesliga side, Karlsruher SC. It took time for Kapllani to adjust to the German league's style of play and started only 15 games in his first season, scoring just 1 goal. In the 2005–06 season Kapllani became a more regular first team player, appearing in 25 league games that season, scoring six goals. He had a very successful 2006–07 season with Karlsruher SC, as he became the second highest goalscorer in the 2. Bundesliga with 17 goals in 30 appearances, behind teammate and strike partner Giovanni Federico, who netted 19 times in the same season. Both players helped the club gain promotion to the Bundesliga after a nine-year absence. In the 2007–08 season, Kapllani found it difficult to adjust to the top division, starting only 14 of his 28 matches and scoring just two goals. Despite Kapllani's unsteady form, Karlsruher SC finished in eleventh place, securing top-flight football for another year.

However, the following season proved to be even more disappointing. Kapllani started only six of his 20 appearances because Edmund Becker entrusted the strike position to Joshua Kennedy even though the Australian wasn't able to score a single goal until the final match of the season. As a result, only one team scored more seldom than Karlsruhe and the club was relegated from the Bundesliga. Kapllani's only sense of achievement followed from his goal in the first round of the DFB-Pokal.

FC Augsburg
On 27 May 2009, Kapllani took advantage of a contract clause and left Karlsruhe for FC Augsburg on a free transfer, signing a contract until 2011.

TuS Koblenz
On 7 January 2010, FC Augsburg loaned Kapllani to TuS Koblenz until the end of the season. Altogether Kapllani scored 5 goals in 17 appearances and was the club's top scorer in the second half of the season.

SC Paderborn
Following his return to Augsburg, Kapllani scored in the first round of the DFB-Pokal. On 31 August 2010, he joined SC Paderborn 07 on loan until the end of the season. He was the club's top scorer in the 2010–11 campaign, scoring 8 goals in 23 games despite suffering a cruciate ligament rupture in February 2011. In the meantime, Augsburg gained promotion to the Bundesliga for the first time in the club's history. As a result, Kapllani's contract was extended automatically and he returned to top-flight football for the first time since 2009.

FSV Frankfurt
On 1 July 2012, after his contract had ended, he left FC Augsburg and signed a two-year contract with FSV Frankfurt until 30 June 2014.

He started the 2014–15 season by scoring twice in a 2–3 loss against his former side Karlsruher SC. Eight days later, he scored two more in the first round of DFB-Pokal against Sportfreunde Siegen, where his team won 5–4 on penalties with Kapllani also converting his penalty shootout attempt.

On 15 May 2016, Kapllani scored two goals with penalty kick against 1860 Munich in a 2–1 home win on the last day of the 2. Bundesliga season. However, Frankfurt was relegated to 3. Liga after finishing the season in penultimate spot with only 32 points.

On 30 June 2016, Kapllani officially left the club after four seasons, due to lack of fairness from the club directors. During his spell with the club, Kapllani scored 36 league goals in 101 appearances, also four goals in seven cup matches.

Elversberg
On 12 July 2016, Kapllani joined SV Elversberg of Regionalliga on a free transfer. He signed a contract until June 2018. Upon signing, Roland Seitz, one of the club directors, stated: "We are pleased that he has joined SV Elversberg. Edmond is valuable not only for his football skills, but for more. He brings to the team his strength, character and leadership skills. He'll be an added value for the team of coach Michael Wiesinger."

International career
He made his debut for Albania in a March 2004 friendly match against Iceland in Tirana and earned a total of 41 caps, scoring 6 goals. His final international was a June 2014 friendly match away against San Marino. Kapllani was the nation's top scorer in the Euro 2008 qualifying, scoring three goals in his country's two matches against Luxembourg and another two goals in games against Belarus and Romania.

Personal life
Kapllani is the younger brother of the retired football goalkeeper Xhevair Kapllani, a former player of hometown club Teuta Durrës. He is married and has two children, a daughter named Vivien born in 2009 and a son named Noel born in 2012.

Career statistics

Club

International

International goals
As of match played 8 June 2014. Albania score listed first, score column indicates score after each Kapllani goal.

Honours

Club
Partizani Tirana
 Albanian First Division: 2000–01

Karlsruher SC
 2. Bundesliga: 2006–07

Individual
 Albania's top goalscorer in the UEFA Euro 2008 qualifying: 5 goals

References

External links
  
 
 

1982 births
Living people
Footballers from Durrës
Albanian footballers
Albania youth international footballers
Albania international footballers
Association football forwards
KF Teuta Durrës players
FK Partizani Tirana players
HNK Orijent players
Besa Kavajë players
Karlsruher SC players
FC Augsburg players
TuS Koblenz players
SC Paderborn 07 players
FSV Frankfurt players
SV Elversberg players
Kategoria Superiore players
Kategoria e Parë players
Bundesliga players
2. Bundesliga players
Regionalliga players
Albanian expatriate footballers
Expatriate footballers in Croatia
Expatriate footballers in Germany
Albanian expatriate sportspeople in Croatia
Albanian expatriate sportspeople in Germany